Echidnocymbium is a genus of lichenized fungus in the family Ramalinaceae. This is a monotypic genus, containing the single species Echidnocymbium speciosum.

References

Ramalinaceae
Lichen genera
Monotypic Lecanorales genera
Taxa described in 1987